Ghanaian Canadians are Canadians of full or partial Ghanaian ancestry. Ghanaians who became naturalized citizens of Canada preferably refer to themselves as Ghanaian Canadians.

Overview

Ghanaians first immigrated to Canada in the 1960s. Many Ghanaians reside in the Toronto area, although quite a few can be found in other parts of Canada. Although characterized by their religious involvement, Ghanaian Canadians seem to have reservations about integrating into broader Canadian community.

Languages 
Most Ghanaian Canadians speak English fluently as it is the official language of communication in Ghana. Most also speak local languages in addition to English, the most popular being Twi. Other spoken languages are Fante, Ga, Ewe, Dagbani, Nzema, Gonja, and Kasem. Ghanaians have an easier time adapting to life in Canada than other immigrants because their homeland of Ghana has the English language as the official language and it is spoken by the majority of Ghana's population.

Demographics

Notable people

References

African Canadian
History of Ghana
Ethnic groups in Canada